Louis-José Houde (born October 19, 1977 in Saint-Apollinaire, Quebec) is a French-Canadian actor and comedian. He is best known for his performances in films such as Bon Cop, Bad Cop in 2006, Father and Guns (De père en flic) in 2009, A Sense of Humour (Le Sens de l'humour) in 2011 and Compulsive Liar (Menteur) in 2019. 

Houde has hosted two TV shows on Radio-Canada: Louis-José Houde, à suivre... (2005) and Ici Louis-José Houde (2006). In 2003, he won a Félix Award for comic show of the year.

He championed Un petit pas pour l'homme by Stéphane Dompierre in Le combat des livres 2006.

He is a graduate of Quebec's École nationale de l'humour.

Personal life
He was in a relationship with actress Magalie Lépine-Blondeau until the couple announced their separation in early 2019.

References

External links 
 
 

1977 births
French Quebecers
Living people
Comedians from Quebec
People from Chaudière-Appalaches
Male actors from Quebec
Canadian male film actors
Canadian male television actors
Canadian stand-up comedians